Periclimenaeus is a genus of decapod crustaceans of the family Palaemonidae which is part of the infraorder Caridea. The genus was named by the English carcinologist  Lancelot Alexander Borradaile in 1915. He set out the distinguishing features of the genus as:

Pericimaenaeus robustus is known only from the type specimen which was collected off Amirante Islands by the Western Indian Ocean Expeditions of Prof. J. Stanley Gardiner and described in 1915 and again in 1917 by Borradaile, it was re-described by Dr A.J. "Sandy" Bruce of the Queensland Museum in 2005.

Biological notes
Periclimenaeus consists of number of species of small shrimps classified in the subfamily Pontoniinae. They occur mainly in tropical seas, especially in and around coral reefs. Periclimanaeus shrimps live in association with a variety of hosts, mostly sponges and ascidian tunicates, where they normally live in the hosts' internal cavities as pairs formed of a male and a female. Characteristics of the genus include the presence of grossly unequal chelae on the second pair of walking legs, the larger of which has a conspicuous molar process on the seventh and terminal segment of the leg, which sits opposite a depression on the fixed finger, this is used to produce sound, a feature which is convergent with similar structures in the related genus Coralliocaris and in some unrelated genera of snapping shrimps from the family Alpheidae.

Species
Periclimenaeus is the genus in the Palaemonidae with the second highest number of species with their distribution centred on the Indo-West Pacific region where there are 60 or so species with a further 14 identified so far in the Atlantic and eastern Pacific. The first species to be described was described from specimens caught in the Torres Strait by HMS Alert during 1881-82. These specimens were described by Edward J. Miers as Coralliocaris tridendatus, this was then assigned to Periclimenaeus as P. tridentatus after Borradaile named the genus.

The following species are currently recognised:

 Periclimenaeus ancylodactylus Bruce, 2014
 Periclimenaeus arabicus (Calman, 1939)
 Periclimenaeus ardeae Bruce, 1970
 Periclimenaeus arthrodactylus Holthuis, 1952
 Periclimenaeus ascidiarum Holthuis, 1951
 Periclimenaeus atlanticus (Rathbun, 1901)
 Periclimenaeus aurae dos Santos, Calado & Araújo, 2008
 Periclimenaeus aurantiacus Bruce, 2014
 Periclimenaeus bermudensis (Armstrong, 1940)
 Periclimenaeus bidentatus Bruce, 1970
 Periclimenaeus bouvieri (Nobili, 1904)
 Periclimenaeus bredini Chace, 1972
 Periclimenaeus brucei Cardoso & Young, 2007
 Periclimenaeus calmani Bruce, 2012
 Periclimenaeus caraibicus Holthuis, 1951
 Periclimenaeus chacei Abele, 1971
 Periclimenaeus colemani Bruce, 2014
 Periclimenaeus colodactylus Bruce, 1996
 Periclimenaeus crassipes (Calman, 1939)
 Periclimenaeus creefi Bruce, 2010
 Periclimenaeus crosnieri Cardoso & Young, 2007
 Periclimenaeus dactylodon Bruce, 2012
 Periclimenaeus denticulodigitus Bruce, 2014
 Periclimenaeus devaneyi Bruce, 2010
 Periclimenaeus diplosomatis Bruce, 1980
 Periclimenaeus djiboutensis Bruce, 1970
 Periclimenaeus echinimanus Ďuriš, Horka & Al-Horani, 2011
 Periclimenaeus edmondsoni Bruce, 2013
 Periclimenaeus fawatu Bruce, 2006
 Periclimenaeus forcipulatus Bruce, 2014
 Periclimenaeus garthi Bruce, 1976
 Periclimenaeus gorgonidarum (Balss, 1913)
 Periclimenaeus hancocki Holthuis, 1951
 Periclimenaeus hebedactylus Bruce, 1970
 Periclimenaeus hecate (Nobili, 1904)
 Periclimenaeus heronensis Bruce, 2010
 Periclimenaeus holthuisi Bruce, 1969
 Periclimenaeus jeancharcoti Bruce, 1991
 Periclimenaeus kottae Bruce, 2005
 Periclimenaeus leptodactylus Fujino & Miyake, 1968
 Periclimenaeus lobiferus Bruce, 1978
 Periclimenaeus manihinei Bruce, 1976
 Periclimenaeus marini Bruce, 2013
 Periclimenaeus matherae Bruce, 2005
 Periclimenaeus maxillulidens (Schmitt, 1936)
 Periclimenaeus minutus Holthuis, 1952
 Periclimenaeus mortenseni Bruce, 1993
 Periclimenaeus myora Bruce, 1998
 Periclimenaeus nielbrucei Bruce, 2006
 Periclimenaeus nobilii Bruce, 1975
 Periclimenaeus nufu Ďuriš, Horká & Hoc, 2009
 Periclimenaeus orbitocarinatus Fransen, 2006
 Periclimenaeus orontes Bruce, 1986
 Periclimenaeus pachydentatus Bruce, 1969
 Periclimenaeus pachyspinosus Marin, 2007
 Periclimenaeus pacificus Holthuis, 1951
 Periclimenaeus palauensis Miyake & Fujino, 1968
 Periclimenaeus parkeri Bruce, 2012
 Periclimenaeus pearsei (Schmitt, 1932)
 Periclimenaeus pectinidactylus Ďuriš, Horká & Sandford, 2009
 Periclimenaeus perlatus (Boone, 1930)
 Periclimenaeus pulitzerfinali Bruce, 2011
 Periclimenaeus quadridentatus (Rathbun, 1906)
 Periclimenaeus rastrifer Bruce, 1980
 Periclimenaeus rhodope (Nobili, 1904)
 Periclimenaeus robustus Borradaile, 1915
 Periclimenaeus schmitti Holthuis, 1951
 Periclimenaeus serenei Bruce, 2012
 Periclimenaeus serrula Bruce & Coombes, 1995
 Periclimenaeus solitus Bruce & Coombes, 1995
 Periclimenaeus spinosus Holthuis, 1951
 Periclimenaeus spongicola Holthuis, 1952
 Periclimenaeus storchi Bruce, 1989
 Periclimenaeus stylirostris Bruce, 1969
 Periclimenaeus tchesunovi Ďuriš, 1990
 Periclimenaeus tridentatus (Miers, 1884)
 Periclimenaeus trispinosus Bruce, 1969
 Periclimenaeus tuamotae Bruce, 1969
 Periclimenaeus uropodialis Barnard, 1958
 Periclimenaeus usitatus Bruce, 1969
 Periclimenaeus wilsoni (Hay, 1917)
 Periclimenaeus wolffi Bruce, 1993
 Periclimenaeus zanzibaricus Bruce, 1969
 Periclimenaeus zarenkovi Ďuriš, 1990

References

Palaemonoidea